Peter Rodriguez and Companions were a group of 7 Spanish martyrs, who were members of the Knights of Santiago of Portugal. They were captured by Moors and martyred.

References

Spanish Roman Catholic saints
13th-century Christian saints
1242 deaths
Year of birth unknown

pt:Castelo de Tavira#A lenda dos sete cavaleiros